Mary Louise Pratt (born 1948) is a Silver Professor and Professor of Spanish and Portuguese Languages and Literatures at New York University. She received her B.A. in Modern Languages and Literatures from the University of Toronto in 1970, her M.A. in Linguistics from the University of Illinois at Urbana in 1971, and her PhD in Comparative Literature from Stanford University in 1975.

Her first book, Toward a Speech Act Theory of Literary Discourse, made an important contribution to Critical Theory by demonstrating that the foundation of written literary narrative can be seen in the structure of Oral Narrative. In it Pratt uses the research of William Labov to show that all narratives contain common structures that can be found in both literary and oral narratives.

In her more recent research, Pratt has studied what she calls contact zones - areas in which two or more cultures communicate and negotiate shared histories and power relations. She remarks that contact zones are "social spaces where cultures meet, clash, and grapple with each other, often in contexts of highly asymmetrical relations of power, such as colonialism, slavery, or their aftermaths as they are lived out in many parts of the world today."  In her article "Arts of the Contact Zone," Pratt also coins the term autoethnographic texts, which are "text[s] in which people undertake to describe themselves in ways that engage with representations others have made of them."

Changing public discourse about language acquisition
As a part of the appointment, each Silver professor must write a Silver dialogue, an essay discussing a major issue in his or her field. Pratt used her essay to discuss the obstacles and possible solutions for promoting language learning in America. Pratt frames her argument with an anecdote from a multicultural wedding:

IT WAS a fancy California wedding party at a big Bay Area hotel. The groom's family
spoke Urdu, and the bride's spoke Gujarati and Urdu. Both were practicing Muslims, but
she was from southern California, sometimes regarded by northerners as too laid-back.
The groom was attended by his two best friends from high school, one of Mexican-
Jewish-Anglo parentage and the other of Chinese and Japanese descent via Hawai'i and
Sacramento. 

Pratt uses the wedding as a segue to expose American myths about language. Pratt systematically challenges four common misconceptions about language learning: the willing rejection of heritage languages by immigrants, American hostility to multilingualism, the limit of second language learning to early childhood, and the need of language expertise solely for national security. With each misconception Pratt shows how these factors have come together to create a resistance to language learning that has helped cause the national security crisis that the Critical Language Institutes are trying to solve.

Pratt shows hope for changing the public discourse and outlines four ideas that need to be promoted in order to encourage language acquisition in America. Pratt sees a need to correct ideas about mono- and multilingualism. Americans need to be shown that monolingualism is a handicap and that relying on others' willingness to learn English will simply limit transcultural communication to "all but the most limited and scripted" exchanges Pratt also calls more encouragement of heritage language learning and using local non-English linguistic communities to fulfill needs in language learning and transcultural understanding. Along with using heritage communities, Pratt wants to see educators place more emphasis on advanced language competency and create a pipeline to encourage those who are skilled in language acquisition. In order to bring about these changes, she calls on her fellow academics and other LEPs (linguistically endowed persons) to change how we discuss language learning in American public discourse.

Honors and awards
She was American Academy of Arts and Sciences Fellow of 2019.

Works by Pratt
 
 
 
 
 
 
 Planetary Longings. 2022. Durham: Duke University Press.

References 

Living people
Latin Americanists
American literary critics
Women literary critics
Literary critics of Spanish
New York University faculty
1948 births
American women critics
Presidents of the Modern Language Association